Islam is the dominant religion in Aceh and over 98% from about 4 million population identify as Muslims.

According to data from the 2005 census, religions' percentages in Aceh are 98.87% Islam, 0.87% Protestantism, 0.15% Buddhism, 0.09% Catholicism and 0.02% Hinduism.

Islam in Aceh is Sunni with Shafi'i mazhab in Fiqh.

History 
The earliest Islamic kingdom in Southeast Asia is Samudra Pasai that located in northern coast of Aceh. Its earliest tombstones dated from 622 Hijri / 1226 CE. The tombstone belongs to Ibnu Mahmud and Teungku Raja Ahmad.

See also 
 Islamic criminal law in Aceh

References

 
Culture of Aceh